Humphrey William Freeland (28 August 1814 – 2 October 1892) was a British Liberal politician.

Freeland was elected Liberal MP for Chichester at the 1859 general election but later resigned—by being appointed a Steward of the Manor of Hempholme—from the seat in 1863.

References

External links
 

UK MPs 1859–1865
1814 births
1892 deaths
Liberal Party (UK) MPs for English constituencies